Philip du Preez (born 1 August 1993 in Roodepoort, South Africa) is a South African rugby union player, currently playing for  in the French Pro D2. His regular position is lock.

Career

Youth

Du Preez attended the Krugersdorp-based Hoërskool Monument, where he earned an inclusion into the  squad at the foremost schools rugby union competition in South Africa, the Under-18 Craven Week, held in Kimberley in 2011. He made three appearances as the Golden Lions side qualified to play in the unofficial final match of the competition, there they lost to the Free State Cheetahs.

He was also named in the South African Schools squad at the conclusion of the tournament and came on as a replacement in their match against France which was played in Port Elizabeth as a curtain-raiser to the  versus  match during the 2011 Tri Nations Series.

After high school, Du Preez was included in the  squad that participated in the 2012 Under-19 Provincial Championship, but he made just a single appearance in their 45–14 victory over the s in Bloemfontein. A Gilmore's groin ruled him out for much of the year.

Free State Cheetahs

He permanently moved to Bloemfontein for 2013 to join the  academy based at the University of the Free State. He represented the  during the 2013 Varsity Cup Young Guns competition. In the second half of the year, he made one start and six appearances as a replacement for the s during the 2013 Under-21 Provincial Championship, as the side finished in fifth position on the log to miss out on the title play-offs.

In 2014, Du Preez was included in the  squad that participated in the 2014 Vodacom Cup competition. He wasn't involved in their quarter final match, where the  eliminated them form the competition by winning 22–21 in Bloemfontein.

Bayonne

At the start of 2015, Du Preez moved to French Pro Rugby D2 side, where he joined the youth team (Espoirs) of Basque side  on a trial period for the remainder of the 2014–2015 season.  He was in the starting line-up for their matches against Agen, Brive, Clermont, Montpellier, Pau, Perpignon, Toulon and Toulouse, missing their match against Bordeaux due to concussion.

Southern Kings

On 25 January 2016, the Port Elizabeth-based Southern Kings Super Rugby franchise announced that Du Preez joined them ahead of the 2016 Super Rugby season. He also appeared for George based union the  during their preparations for the 2016 Currie Cup qualification series.

Mont-de-Marsan

In June 2016, French Rugby Pro D2 side  announced that Du Preez would join them for the 2016–2017 season.

Notes

References

Alumni of Monument High School
South African rugby union players
Living people
1993 births
People from Roodepoort
Rugby union locks
Free State Cheetahs players
Rugby union players from Gauteng